is a passenger railway station located in the town of Shōō,  Katsuta District, Okayama Prefecture, Japan, operated by West Japan Railway Company (JR West).

Lines

Station layout
The station consists of two opposed side platforms. The station building is located on the side of the platform bound for Sayo, and both platforms are connected by a level crossing. The station is unattended.

Platforms

Adjacent stations

History
Katsumada Station opened on November 28, 1934.  With the privatization of the Japan National Railways (JNR) on April 1, 1987, the station came under the aegis of the West Japan Railway Company. A new station building was completed in February 2021.

Passenger statistics
In fiscal 2019, the station was used by an average of 126 passengers daily..

Surrounding area
Okayama Prefectural Katsumata High School
Katsumata Elementary School
Shōō Town Hall

See also
List of railway stations in Japan

References

External links

 Katsumada Station Official Site

Railway stations in Okayama Prefecture
Kishin Line
Railway stations in Japan opened in 1934
Shōō, Okayama